"Watch It" is the 19th television play episode of the first season of the Australian anthology television series Australian Playhouse. "Watch It" was written by Richard Barry and directed by Storry Walton and originally aired on ABC on 22 August 1966.

Plot
When watchmaker Ronnie meets a man with a very special wristwatch that "does everything" - it sets his partner Bill on the road to a spell in the cells.

Cast
 John Armstrong as Robbie
 Ed Devereaux as Bill
 Don Crosby
 Edward Hepple
 Beverly Kirk
 Roger Ward

Production
Designer Douglas Smith hired $3,500 worth of watches and clocks. It was reportedly Ed Devereaux's first comedy.

Reception
The Age TV critic said the plot "was rather thin... yet the story had its moments and a dialogue that sparked and entertained. It was even good fun. I should rate it as one of the best in the series."

References

External links
 
 

1966 television plays
1966 Australian television episodes
1960s Australian television plays
Australian Playhouse (season 1) episodes